650 California Street, also known as the Hartford Building, is a 34-story, 142 m (466 feet) office tower on the northwestern edge of San Francisco's Financial District. The tower is located on California Street on the edge of Chinatown, and not far from 555 California Street. 650 California is visible from every direction except from the southeast, where the Financial District skyscrapers block the view.

Description 
The building was designed by Edward Charles Bassett of Skidmore, Owings & Merrill for Hartford Insurance, its initial tenant. It is architecturally significant, featuring a tall modernist lobby, high ceilings, and an exterior skeleton of floor-to-ceiling windows recessed into a square gridwork of precast white reinforced concrete.

For a time it was also California's tallest building, replacing both the Russ Building in San Francisco and the Los Angeles City Hall in Los Angeles, California. It is one of 39 San Francisco high rises reported by the U.S. Geological Survey as potentially vulnerable to a large earthquake, due to a structural deficiency.  

Tishman undertook a  renovation, which included a remodeled lobby by New York-based firm MdeAS Architects.

650 California Street passed the certification requirements for the Gold Level of the Leadership in Energy and Environmental Design (LEED) rating in June 2011. The LEED building certification system is a program for rating the design, construction and operation of environmentally and socially responsible buildings.

The building is the fictional setting of Doris Martin's workplace in The Doris Day Show.

After Elon Musk's acquisition of Twitter, the company ceased paying rent for its 30th floor office rental. In response, the building's landlord filed court papers in San Francisco State Court.

Tenants
Key tenants include Access Communications, Affirm, AppDirect, Analysis Group, CrossInstall, Credit Suisse, Dentsu International, Omnicom Group Inc., Recommind, and Twitter.

See also

 San Francisco's tallest buildings

References

Office buildings completed in 1964
Skyscraper office buildings in San Francisco
Financial District, San Francisco
Skidmore, Owings & Merrill buildings
Leadership in Energy and Environmental Design gold certified buildings
1964 establishments in California